The Ministry of Culture and Tourism is a ministry responsible for formulating cultural and tourism policies of Mainland China. Its headquarters are in Chaoyang District, Beijing. It was formed on 19 March 2018; its predecessors were the Ministry of Culture and China National Tourism Administration.

History
On 19 March 2018, the Government of the People's Republic of China announced that the Ministry of Culture and China National Tourism Administration have been merged to create the Ministry of Culture and Tourism at the first session of the 13th National People's Congress. That same day, Luo Shugang was elected Minister of Culture and Tourism.

In September 2020, China News Service reported that the Ministry of Culture and Tourism stated that it will focus on strengthening the content censorship and on-site supervision of talk shows, Xiangsheng, Pioneer drama, experimental drama and other language shows.

List of ministers

See also 
China Arts and Entertainment Group
Ministries of the People's Republic of China

References 

Culture
China
China
Ministries established in 2018
2018 establishments in China